Barney is a masculine given name, often a short form (hypocorism) of Barnard, Barnett and other names, and occasionally a nickname. It is derived from the Slavic name Barni, the pet form of Barnim, which means "defender", and it was formerly a popular name throughout Poland.  Notable people with the name include:

People

Given name
 Barney Aaron (1800–1850), English-born American Hall of Fame lightweight bare-knuckle boxer
 Young Barney Aaron (1836–1907), English-born American bare-knuckle boxer; son of Barney Aaron
 Barney Barnato (1851–1897), British mining entrepreneur born Barnet Isaacs, one of those who gained control of diamond, and later gold, mining in South Africa
 Barney Clark (died 1983), first human recipient of an artificial heart
 Barney M. Giles (1892–1984), US Army Air Forces lieutenant general
 Barney Hill (1922–1969), American who, with his wife, claimed to have been kidnapped by aliens
 Barney F. Hajiro (1916–2011), US Army soldier awarded the Medal of Honor
 Barney Kessel (1923–2004), American jazz guitarist
 Barney Lebrowitz (1891–1949), better known as "Battling Levinsky", American Hall-of-Fame world champion light heavyweight boxer
 Barney Martin (1923–2005), American actor
 Barney McCosky (1917–1996), Major League Baseball outfielder
 Barney Pelty (1880–1939), American Major League Baseball player
 Barney Poole (1923–2005), National Football League player
 Barney Ross (1909–1967), American Hall-of-Fame world champion boxer born Dov-Ber Rasofsky
 Barney Sedran (1891–1964), American Hall-of-Fame basketball player
 Barney E. Warren (1867–1951), American Christian hymnwriter and minister

Hypocorism
 Bernard Barney Berlinger (1908–2002), American decathlete
 Bernard Barney Carr (Gaelic footballer) (1923–2021), Irish Gaelic football player and manager
 Barnett Barney Danson (1921–2011), Canadian politician and cabinet minister
 Bernhard Barney Dreyfuss (1865–1932), owner of the Pittsburgh Pirates baseball team
 Barnett Barney Frank (born 1940), American former politician
 Barnaby Barney Harwood (born 1979), British actor and television presenter
 Bernard Barney Herbert (1889-1949), Australian rules footballer
 Bernard Barney Hudson (1906-1971), English rugby union and rugby league footballer
 Bernard Barney McKenna (1939-2012), Irish musician and a founding member of The Dubliners
 Berna Barney Oldfield (1878–1946), American automobile racer and pioneer
 Barnet Barney Rosset (1922–2012), owner of Grove Press, and publisher and Editor-in-Chief of the magazine Evergreen Review
 Bernard Barney Wilen (1937–1996), French saxophonist

Nickname
 Barney Bigard (1906–1980), American jazz clarinetist and tenor saxophonist
 Barney Carr (1897–1971), Australian rules footballer
 Barney Greenway (born 1969), British extreme metal vocalist
 Barney McCallum (1926–2019), given name David Brace McCallum, coinventor of the racket sport pickleball
 Barney Roos (1888–1960), American automotive engineer, co-designer of the Willys MB Jeep
 Raymond van Barneveld (born 1967), Dutch professional darts player

Fictional characters
 Barney the Dinosaur, title character of Barney & Friends, a children's TV show about a singing purple dinosaur host, formerly a sometimes singing blue dinosaur host in the early pilot video series of Barney & the Backyard Gang consisting three-part episodes from 1980s.
 Barney Barton, older brother and arch-enemy of the superhero Hawkeye in the Marvel Comics universe
 Barney Bear, the title character of the 1939-1954 animated shorts Barney Bear
 Barney Calhoun, a playable character in Half-Life: Blue Shift and a major character in the Half-Life 2 series
 Barney Collier, from the Mission: Impossible TV series, portrayed by Greg Morris
 Barney Cousins, fictional kidnapper from the 1993 movie The Vanishing
 Barney Fife, from The Andy Griffith Show
 Barney Google, a comic strip character in Barney Google and Snuffy Smith
 Barney Gumble, from The Simpsons
 Barney Martin, a wandering circus boy The Barney Mystery Series of children's books by Enid Blyton
 Barney Miller, a police captain in the TV show Barney Miller
 Barney Ross, the leader of The Expendables
 Barney Rubble, from The Flintstones
 Barney Stinson, from the CBS television series How I Met Your Mother, portrayed by Neil Patrick Harris
 Barney Stockman, from the 1987 Teenage Mutant Ninja Turtles animated TV series
 Barney, a sheepdog in the short-lived British animated children's TV series Barney

See also
 Barnie Boonzaaier (born 1992), South African rugby union player

Masculine given names
Hypocorisms
Lists of people by nickname